The 1999 Pan Arab Games football tournament was the 9th edition of the Pan Arab Games men's football tournament. The football tournament was held in Amman, Jordan between 19–31 August 1999 as part of the 1999 Pan Arab Games.

Participating teams
The following countries have participated for the final tournament:

Squads

Group stages

First group stage

Group A

Group B

Group C
Algeria withdrew

Group D

Second group stage

Group A

Group B

Knockout stage

Semifinals

Final

Final ranking

Goalscorers

8 goals
 Badran Al-Shagran

6 goals
 Hussam Fawzi

External links
9th Pan Arab Games, 1999 (Jordan) – rsssf.com

football
1999
1999 in African football
1999 in Asian football
1999